John Robert "Johnny Hammond" Smith (December 16, 1933 – June 4, 1997) was an American soul jazz and hard bop organist. Born in Louisville, Kentucky, he was a renowned player of the Hammond B-3 organ so earning "Hammond" as a nickname, which also avoided his being confused with jazz guitarist Johnny Smith.

Biography
Smith played with Paul Williams and Chris Columbo before forming his own group. His bands featured singers Etta Jones, Byrdie Green, saxophonists Houston Person, Earl Edwards, guitarists Eddie McFadden, Floyd Smith, James Clark, vibist Freddie McCoy. His career took off as he was serving as accompanist to singer Nancy Wilson. One of his last accomplishments also included Nancy Wilson. He wrote the song "Quiet Fire" for her Nancy Now! release in 1988.

After a 10-year spell on Prestige Records throughout the 1960s resulting in a series of albums, he signed for soul/R&B influenced Kudu imprint of Creed Taylor's  well-regarded CTI Records jazz record label in 1971. His first album for Taylor, Breakout was chosen that year to launch Kudu. The album featured Grover Washington Jr. as a sideman prior to the launch of his career as a solo recording artist. Three further albums followed with Taylor on Kudu, as he decided to refer to himself as "Johnny Hammond", after deciding to drop "Smith" from his name.

His style had become increasingly funky as he adapted to the style changes in music, culminating in two popular albums with the Mizell Brothers, Gambler's Life (1974) for the CTI offshoot, Salvation and then in 1975, Gears after switching to another jazz label, Milestone Records. He began using electric and acoustic pianos, starting with Gambler's Life, in addition to his signature instrument. Hammond's song "Shifting Gears" was featured on the breakbeat compilation Ultimate Breaks and Beats, and was also featured in the soundtrack of the 2006 video game Driver: Parallel Lines as well. His song "Conquistadores Chocolates" was covered by BadBadNotGood
and featured on GTA: The Cayo Perico Heist. (Rockstar Games)

Smith also taught at the Cal Poly Pomona music department for several years, beginning in January 1987.

He died in Victorville, California of cancer at the age of 63.

Discography

As leader
 Have You Heard (Arrow ALP-1200, 1958)
 Imagination (Warwick W-2003, 1959)
 All Soul (New Jazz NJ 8221, 1959)
 That Good Feelin' (New Jazz NJ 8229, 1959; reissued on BGP/Ace in 1993)
 Talk That Talk (New Jazz NJ 8241, 1960; reissued on BGP/Ace in 1993) -with Oliver Nelson
 Stimulation (Prestige PR 7203, 1961) -with Freddie McCoy
 Gettin' the Message (Prestige PR 7217, 1960) -with Lem Winchester
 Johnny "Hammond" Cooks with Gator Tail [also released as Good 'Nuff] (Prestige PR 7239, 1962) -with Willis Jackson
 Look Out! (New Jazz NJ 8288, 1962) -with Seldon Powell
 Black Coffee [live] (Riverside RS 9442, 1962) -with Seldon Powell
 Mr. Wonderful (Riverside RS 9466, 1963) -with Houston Person 
 Open House! (Riverside RS 9482, 1963) -with Thad Jones, Seldon Powell
 A Little Taste (Riverside RS 9496, 1963) -with Virgil Jones, Houston Person
 The Stinger (Prestige PR 7408, 1965) -with Houston Person, Floyd Smith
 Opus De Funk (Prestige PR 7420, 1961 [rel. 1966]) -with Freddie McCoy
 The Stinger Meets the Golden Thrush (Prestige PR 7464, 1966) -with Byrdie Green 
 Love Potion #9 (Prestige PR 7482, 1966) -with Virgil Jones
 Gettin' Up [also released as Ebb Tide] (Prestige PR 7494, 1967) -with Virgil Jones, Houston Person
 Soul Flowers (Prestige PR 7549, 1967) -with Houston Person
 Dirty Grape (Prestige PR 7564, 1968) -with Houston Person
 Nasty! (Prestige PR 7588, 1968) -with Houston Person, John Abercrombie, Grady Tate 
 Soul Talk (Prestige PR 7681, 1969) -with Rusty Bryant, Bernard Purdie
 Black Feeling! (Prestige PR 7736, 1969) -with Virgil Jones, Rusty Bryant
 Here It 'Tis (Prestige PR 10002, 1970) -with Houston Person, Bernard Purdie
 What's Going On (Prestige PR 10015, 1971) -with Grover Washington Jr.
 Breakout (Kudu/CTI KU-01, 1971; reissued on Epic/Legacy in 2002)
 Wild Horses Rock Steady (Kudu/CTI KU-04, 1971; reissued on Sony Masterworks in 2011)
 The Prophet (Kudu/CTI KU-10, 1972)
 Higher Ground (Kudu/CTI KU-16, 1973; reissued on CBS Associated in 1987)
 Gambler's Life (Salvation/CTI SAL-702, 1974; reissued on Soul Brother [UK] Records in 2001)
 Gears (Milestone M-9062, 1975; reissued on BGP/Ace in 1992)
 Forever Taurus (Milestone M-9068, 1976; reissued on BGP/Ace in 1992)
 Storm Warning (Milestone M-9076, 1977)
 Don't Let The System Get You (Milestone M-9083, 1978)

LP/CD compilations
 The Best Of Johnny "Hammond" Smith (Prestige PR 7705, 1969)
 The Best Of Johnny "Hammond" Smith For Lovers (Prestige PR 7777, 1970)
 Talk That Talk (Prestige, 1995) (compilation of Talk That Talk + Gettin' The Message)
 That Good Feelin'  (Prestige, 1996) (compilation of All Soul + That Good Feelin)
 Legends Of Acid Jazz: Johnny "Hammond" Smith (Prestige, 1996) (compilation of Soul Talk + Black Feeling!)
 Black Coffee (Milestone, 1997) (compilation of Black Coffee + Mr. Wonderful)
 Legends Of Acid Jazz: Johnny "Hammond" Smith - Soul Flowers (Prestige, 1999) (compilation of Soul Flowers + Dirty Grape)
 The Soulful Blues (Prestige, 2000) (compilation of Ebb Tide + Nasty!)
 Open House (Milestone, 2001) (compilation of Open House! + A Little Taste)
 Good 'Nuff (Prestige, 2003) (compilation of Cooks With Gator Tail + The Stinger)
 Opus De Funk (Prestige, 2004) (compilation of Stimulation + Opus De Funk)

As sidemanWith Gene AmmonsVelvet Soul (Prestige, 1960/1961/1962 [rel. 1964])
Angel Eyes (Prestige, 1960/1962 [rel. 1965])With Billy ButlerNight Life (Prestige, 1971)With Chris ColumbusJazz: Re-Discovering Old Favorites [also released as Summertime] (Strand, 1962)With Byrdie GreenThe Golden Thrush Strikes at Midnight (Prestige PR 7503, 1966)
I Got It Bad (And That Ain't Good) (Prestige PR 7509, 1967)
Sister Byrdie! (Prestige PR 7574, 1968)With Oliver NelsonTaking Care of Business (New Jazz, 1960)With Sylvia Syms'''For Once in My Life'' (Prestige, 1967)

References

External links

1933 births
1997 deaths
Musicians from Louisville, Kentucky
Soul-jazz organists
Hard bop organists
American jazz organists
American male organists
Prestige Records artists
Milestone Records artists
Riverside Records artists
20th-century American keyboardists
Jazz musicians from Kentucky
20th-century organists
20th-century American male musicians
American male jazz musicians
CTI Records artists
20th-century African-American musicians